Cercospora fragariae is a fungal plant pathogen.

See also
 List of strawberry diseases

References

fragariae
Fungal strawberry diseases